Abijah Gilbert (June 18, 1806November 23, 1881) was a United States Senator from Florida.

Born in Gilbertsville, New York, Gilbert attended Gilbertsville Academy and entered Hamilton College (in Clinton, New York) in 1822 as a member of the class of 1826, but did not return the following year.  He spent 1822 to 1850 engaged in mercantile pursuits in New York City before moving to St. Augustine, Florida in 1865.

An early advocate of abolitionism, Gilbert was a strong supporter of the Whig Party and, later on, the Republican Party.  He was elected to represent Florida in the United States Senate as a Republican, and served from 1869 to 1875 as part of the Reconstruction effort. During that period of time, he missed 40.4% of roll call votes.

Gilbert retired from business and political life after his Senate term ended while continuing to live in St. Augustine.  He moved back to Gilbertsville shortly before his death in 1881. He is buried in Brookside Cemetery in Gilbertsville.

See also
List of United States senators from Florida
United States congressional delegations from Florida

References

External links

Abijah Gilbert at PoliticalGraveyard.com

1806 births
1881 deaths
People from Gilbertsville, New York
New York (state) Whigs
Florida Republicans
Republican Party United States senators from Florida
19th-century American politicians
People from St. Augustine, Florida
American abolitionists
Activists from New York (state)
Activists from Florida
Hamilton College (New York) alumni